Glenveagh is the second-largest national park in Ireland. Located in County Donegal, it includes Glenveagh Castle grounds, Lough Veagh, and much of the Derryveagh Mountains. National parks in Ireland conform to IUCN standards.

Geography
The park covers 170 square kilometres and includes much of the Derryveagh Mountains, Lough Veagh and Glenveagh Castle on its shores. The castle gardens display a multitude of exotic and delicate plants.

History
Captain John George Adair (1823–1885), an Anglo-Irish businessman, built Glenveagh Castle and founded the Glenveagh estate. Adair came into dispute with his Irish Catholic tenants over hunting and fishing rights and trespassing sheep. During the 1861 famine, Adair evicted 44 families (224 people total) from their blackhouses on his land, earning him the nickname "Black Jack Adair".

The estate passed to his wife Cornelia Adair. It was then bought by Arthur Kingsley Porter in 1929, before being bought by Henry Plumer McIlhenny in 1937. McIlhenny bequeathed Glenveagh to the Irish state in the 1970s, but continued to use the castle as a part-time residence until 1982.

The park is home to the largest herd of red deer in Ireland and the formerly extirpated golden eagle were reintroduced into the park in 2000. In winter 2018 and spring 2019, many native and non-native trees and plants were cleared from the park, and the water and pipe system was updated.

See also
List of loughs in Ireland

References

External links

National Parks Website
Glenveagh National Park Website
Glenveagh Gardens guide (archived)
In Depth History of Glenveagh
Walk of the Week: Glenveagh National Park Donegal

Important Bird Areas of the Republic of Ireland
National parks of the Republic of Ireland
North Atlantic moist mixed forests
Protected areas established in 1986
Glenveagh National Park
1986 establishments in Ireland